Kingoriidae is an extinct family of dicynodont therapsids. It includes the Late Permian Dicynodontoides (initially called Kingoria) and the Triassic Kombuisia.

References

Dicynodonts
Lopingian first appearances
Prehistoric therapsid families